The Indonesian Forest Rangers (abbreviated "") is a park ranger civil service within the Ministry of Environment and Forestry of Indonesia. It serves on a national and regional level in the country. Polhut is a dedicated unit in the Ministry of Environment and Forestry to preserve and protect forest within its authority given by law in forestry and wildlife. Despite having the word "", translated as "police", on its name, Polhut is not part of the Indonesian National Police (Polri).

History
Before the colonization period of the Netherlands (before 1592), there was no dedicated unit acting as park ranger. However, the function was already covered in customary law and local culture and tradition in preserving and protection forest and its wildlife; these were already done from generation to generation.

Dedicated personnel as park rangers were created, during the colonization period of the Netherlands. In 1870, an agrarian law to define the forest area was introduced. A year later, an official park ranger named  was formed with the main task of overseeing any forest boundary violations. The first park ranger school was established in Madiun in 1941.

During this period the park rangers were heavily trained in the military style.

15 years after the independence of Indonesia, Director I Perhutani Central Java (now, Perhutani Unit I Central Java) with Commander of Police 94 Pati considered that it was necessary to form the  park ranger police , or Special Forest Police, to tackle security disturbance in the forest within former  Central Java.

Minister of Agriculture Decree No 194/Kpts/Um/3/1982 dated 27 March 1982 regarding Special Forestry Police for all Indonesia was issued. The decree also defined the difference between Special Forestry Police and Special Forest Police (for Perhutani territory only).
Minister of Forestry Decree No 471/Kpts-II/1988 dated 30 September 1988, formally revised the Special Forestry Police's name to be .

Task and function

POLHUT have three main tasks, which are preemptive, preventive and repressive actions.

Preemptive

Preemptive actions' primary purpose is to prevent, reduce, and eliminate the intent of any person or group to perform forestry crimes. Such actions are as follows:
 Public awareness and counseling
 Guidance and community awareness

Preventive

Preventive action is any action in order to prevent, reduce, or eliminate any possibility of any person or group to perform forestry crimes. Such action are as follows:
 Forest patrol
 Guard certain areas
 Identification of threats, security problems, or crime potency

Repressive

Repressive actions consist of but not limited to:
 Law enforcement operations
 Evidence gathering
 Securing evidence
 Suspect arrest operations
 Wildlife conflicts
 Firefighting
 Suspect, witness or evidence escort

Organization

POLHUT organization consists of:

  (National Forest Rangers)
  (Regional Forest Rangers) 

POLHUT has its own rapid response unit formed in 2005, named  (Forest Rangers Rapid Response Unit), translated as POLHUT's rapid response unit. Based on Minister of Forestry decree No.P.75/Menhut-II/2014 regarding POLHUT, SPORC is a unit within POLHUT with enhanced qualification to overcome forestry security issues in an efficient, effective and accurate manner.

Weapons 
POLHUT officers are trained in the use of firearms for protection. Semi-automatic pistols are issued to most units. SPORC officers are also trained in the use of shotguns and sub-machine guns.

 CZ 83 – standard issue sidearm
 PM1 A1 – standard issue SMG, locally manufactured Beretta M12 by Pindad under license 
 Vepr-12 – standard issue shotgun

References

External links
  Kementerian Kehutanan dan Lingkungan Hidup

Forestry in Indonesia
Specialist law enforcement agencies of Indonesia